The IBM 6670 Information Distributor (6670-001) was a combination laser printer and photocopier introduced by IBM. Announced on February 14, 1979, as part of Office System/6, its feature set included two-sided printing.

The New York Times described it in 1979 as "A key component of the office of tomorrow." Although Wang was first to market an Intelligent copier, the 6670 is "closer to the standard envisioned."

The IBM 6670 Information Distributor and its Collator unit (the IBM 6671) were withdrawn from marketing on November 19, 1986.

History
IBMs goal with the 6670 was to produce:  "A high-speed copying machine that can be linked electronically to computers, word-processing typewriters and other automated office equipment" 

The IBM 6670 was essentially a half speed IBM Series III Copier Model 10 to which a laser imaging system and associated electronics was added.  Due to the speed of available solid state logic at that time, it was necessary to run the photoconductor drum at half the speed of the Series III, meaning it could only print up to 36 pages per minute, where the model 10 copier  was rated at 75 copies per minute.

The IBM 6670 used a 5 milliwatt HeNe Laser (compared to 25 milliwatts in the earlier IBM 3800 or 1 milliwatt in the IBM 3666 barcode scanner). As part of the printing process it used an 18 facet rotating mirror that ran at 8000 RPM.  Print resolution was 240 x 240 dots per inch.

The IBM 6670 Model II Information Distributor (6670-002) was announced around August 1981 The main differences were:

 The Model I could receive SNA data at 4800 bits per second. The Model II could receive SNA data at 9600 bits per second. 
 The Model I could 6 fonts per document, 4 per page.  The Model II could hold 20 fonts, 14 communication loaded, 4 standard and 2 optional.

The IBM 6670 Model III Information Distributor (6670-003) was announced Aug 2, 1983.  It had no copier function and offered 25 fonts.

In late 1982 it was considered by Hewlett-Packard as competing against the HP2680A laser printer.

As envisioned, an extension released a year later by a third party enabled "6670 .. terminal users (sic; to) send and receive data directly from other 6670s" in what the New York Times described as (a form of) electronic mail.

See also
 IBM 5520
 IBM 3800
IBM Copier Family

References

Computer printers
Computer-related introductions in 1979
Photocopiers
Laser printers
IBM printers